Midijum Records is a Germany-based trance music record label.  Founded in 1998 by Andreas Binotsch, aka DJ Bim, artists that have released music on Midijum include: Aerospace, Shayning, Silent Sphere, Auricular (a psychedelic trance progressive duo from Hamburg, Germany), and Mad Contrabender.
Midijum Records is a subsidiary label of Plusquam Records.

See also
 List of record labels

External links
 Midijum Records homepage

German record labels
Record labels established in 1999
Trance record labels
1999 establishments in Germany